Operations research (U.S. Air Force Specialty Code: Operations Analysis), often shortened to the initialism OR, is a discipline that deals with the development and application of analytical methods to improve decision-making. It is considered to be a subfield of mathematical sciences. The term management science is occasionally used as a synonym.

Employing techniques from other mathematical sciences, such as modeling, statistics, and optimization, operations research arrives at optimal or near-optimal solutions to decision-making problems. Because of its emphasis on practical applications, operations research has overlapped with many other disciplines, notably industrial engineering. Operations research is often concerned with determining the extreme values of some real-world objective: the maximum (of profit, performance, or yield) or minimum (of loss, risk, or cost). Originating in military efforts before World War II, its techniques have grown to concern problems in a variety of industries.

Overview
Operational research (OR) encompasses the development and the use of a wide range of problem-solving techniques and methods applied in the pursuit of improved decision-making and efficiency, such as simulation, mathematical optimization, queueing theory and other stochastic-process models, Markov decision processes, econometric methods, data envelopment analysis, ordinal priority approach, neural networks, expert systems, decision analysis, and the analytic hierarchy process. Nearly all of these techniques involve the construction of mathematical models that attempt to describe the system. Because of the computational and statistical nature of most of these fields, OR also has strong ties to computer science and analytics. Operational researchers faced with a new problem must determine which of these techniques are most appropriate given the nature of the system, the goals for improvement, and constraints on time and computing power, or develop a new technique specific to the problem at hand (and, afterwards, to that type of problem).

The major sub-disciplines in modern operational research, as identified by the journal Operations Research, are:
 Computing and information technologies
 Financial engineering
 Manufacturing, service sciences, and supply chain management
 Policy modeling and public sector work
Revenue management
 Simulation
 Stochastic models
 Transportation theory (mathematics) 
 Game theory for strategies
 Linear programming 
 Nonlinear programming 
 Integer programming in NP-complete problem specially for 0-1 integer linear programming for binary
 Dynamic programming in Aerospace engineering and Economics 
 Information theory used in Cryptography, Quantum computing 
 Quadratic programming for solutions of Quadratic equation and Quadratic function

History
In the decades after the two world wars, the tools of operations research were more widely applied to problems in business, industry, and society. Since that time, operational research has expanded into a field widely used in industries ranging from petrochemicals to airlines, finance, logistics, and government, moving to a focus on the development of mathematical models that can be used to analyse and optimize sometimes complex systems, and has become an area of active academic and industrial research.

Historical origins
In the 17th century, mathematicians Blaise Pascal and Christiaan Huygens solved problems involving sometimes complex decisions (problem of points) by using game-theoretic ideas and expected values; others, such as Pierre de Fermat and Jacob Bernoulli, solved these types of problems using combinatorial reasoning instead. Charles Babbage's research into the cost of transportation and sorting of mail led to England's universal "Penny Post" in 1840, and to studies into the dynamical behaviour of railway vehicles in defence of the GWR's broad gauge. Beginning in the 20th century, study of inventory management could be considered the origin of modern operations research with economic order quantity developed by Ford W. Harris in 1913. Operational research may have originated in the efforts of military planners during World War I (convoy theory and Lanchester's laws). Percy Bridgman brought operational research to bear on problems in physics in the 1920s and would later attempt to extend these to the social sciences.

Modern operational research originated at the Bawdsey Research Station in the UK in 1937 as the result of an initiative of the station's superintendent, A. P. Rowe and Robert Watson-Watt. Rowe conceived the idea as a means to analyse and improve the working of the UK's early-warning radar system, code-named "Chain Home" (CH). Initially, Rowe analysed the operating of the radar equipment and its communication networks, expanding later to include the operating personnel's behaviour. This revealed unappreciated limitations of the CH network and allowed remedial action to be taken.

Scientists in the United Kingdom (including Patrick Blackett (later Lord Blackett OM PRS), Cecil Gordon, Solly Zuckerman, (later Baron Zuckerman OM, KCB, FRS), C. H. Waddington, Owen Wansbrough-Jones, Frank Yates, Jacob Bronowski and Freeman Dyson), and in the United States (George Dantzig) looked for ways to make better decisions in such areas as logistics and training schedules.

Second World War

The modern field of operational research arose during World War II. In the World War II era, operational research was defined as "a scientific method of providing executive departments with a quantitative basis for decisions regarding the operations under their control". Other names for it included operational analysis (UK Ministry of Defence from 1962) and quantitative management.

During the Second World War close to 1,000 men and women in Britain were engaged in operational research. About 200 operational research scientists worked for the British Army.

Patrick Blackett worked for several different organizations during the war. Early in the war while working for the Royal Aircraft Establishment (RAE) he set up a team known as the "Circus" which helped to reduce the number of anti-aircraft artillery rounds needed to shoot down an enemy aircraft from an average of over 20,000 at the start of the Battle of Britain to 4,000 in 1941.

In 1941, Blackett moved from the RAE to the Navy, after first working with RAF Coastal Command, in 1941 and then early in 1942 to the Admiralty. Blackett's team at Coastal Command's Operational Research Section (CC-ORS) included two future Nobel prize winners and many other people who went on to be pre-eminent in their fields. They undertook a number of crucial analyses that aided the war effort. Britain introduced the convoy system to reduce shipping losses, but while the principle of using warships to accompany merchant ships was generally accepted, it was unclear whether it was better for convoys to be small or large. Convoys travel at the speed of the slowest member, so small convoys can travel faster. It was also argued that small convoys would be harder for German U-boats to detect. On the other hand, large convoys could deploy more warships against an attacker. Blackett's staff showed that the losses suffered by convoys depended largely on the number of escort vessels present, rather than the size of the convoy. Their conclusion was that a few large convoys are more defensible than many small ones.

While performing an analysis of the methods used by RAF Coastal Command to hunt and destroy submarines, one of the analysts asked what colour the aircraft were. As most of them were from Bomber Command they were painted black for night-time operations. At the suggestion of CC-ORS a test was run to see if that was the best colour to camouflage the aircraft for daytime operations in the grey North Atlantic skies. Tests showed that aircraft painted white were on average not spotted until they were 20% closer than those painted black. This change indicated that 30% more submarines would be attacked and sunk for the same number of sightings. As a result of these findings Coastal Command changed their aircraft to using white undersurfaces.

Other work by the CC-ORS indicated that on average if the trigger depth of aerial-delivered depth charges were changed from 100 to 25 feet, the kill ratios would go up. The reason was that if a U-boat saw an aircraft only shortly before it arrived over the target then at 100 feet the charges would do no damage (because the U-boat wouldn't have had time to descend as far as 100 feet), and if it saw the aircraft a long way from the target it had time to alter course under water so the chances of it being within the 20-foot kill zone of the charges was small. It was more efficient to attack those submarines close to the surface when the targets' locations were better known than to attempt their destruction at greater depths when their positions could only be guessed. Before the change of settings from 100 to 25 feet, 1% of submerged U-boats were sunk and 14% damaged. After the change, 7% were sunk and 11% damaged; if submarines were caught on the surface but had time to submerge just before being attacked, the numbers rose to 11% sunk and 15% damaged. Blackett observed "there can be few cases where such a great operational gain had been obtained by such a small and simple change of tactics".

Bomber Command's Operational Research Section (BC-ORS), analyzed a report of a survey carried out by RAF Bomber Command. For the survey, Bomber Command inspected all bombers returning from bombing raids over Germany over a particular period. All damage inflicted by German air defenses was noted and the recommendation was given that armor be added in the most heavily damaged areas. This recommendation was not adopted because the fact that the aircraft were able to return with these areas damaged indicated the areas were not vital, and adding armor to non-vital areas where damage is acceptable reduces aircraft performance. Their suggestion to remove some of the crew so that an aircraft loss would result in fewer personnel losses, was also rejected by RAF command. Blackett's team made the logical recommendation that the armor be placed in the areas which were completely untouched by damage in the bombers who returned. They reasoned that the survey was biased, since it only included aircraft that returned to Britain. The areas untouched in returning aircraft were probably vital areas, which, if hit, would result in the loss of the aircraft. This story has been disputed, with a similar damage assessment study completed in the US by the Statistical Research Group at Columbia University, the result of work done by Abraham Wald.

When Germany organized its air defences into the Kammhuber Line, it was realized by the British that if the RAF bombers were to fly in a bomber stream they could overwhelm the night fighters who flew in individual cells directed to their targets by ground controllers. It was then a matter of calculating the statistical loss from collisions against the statistical loss from night fighters to calculate how close the bombers should fly to minimize RAF losses.

The "exchange rate" ratio of output to input was a characteristic feature of operational research. By comparing the number of flying hours put in by Allied aircraft to the number of U-boat sightings in a given area, it was possible to redistribute aircraft to more productive patrol areas. Comparison of exchange rates established "effectiveness ratios" useful in planning. The ratio of 60 mines laid per ship sunk was common to several campaigns: German mines in British ports, British mines on German routes, and United States mines in Japanese routes.

Operational research doubled the on-target bomb rate of B-29s bombing Japan from the Marianas Islands by increasing the training ratio from 4 to 10 percent of flying hours; revealed that wolf-packs of three United States submarines were the most effective number to enable all members of the pack to engage targets discovered on their individual patrol stations; revealed that glossy enamel paint was more effective camouflage for night fighters than conventional dull camouflage paint finish, and a smooth paint finish increased airspeed by reducing skin friction.

On land, the operational research sections of the Army Operational Research Group (AORG) of the Ministry of Supply (MoS) were landed in Normandy in 1944, and they followed British forces in the advance across Europe. They analyzed, among other topics, the effectiveness of artillery, aerial bombing and anti-tank shooting.

After World War II

In 1947 under the auspices of the British Association, a symposium was organized in Dundee. In his opening address, Watson-Watts offered a definition of the aims of OR:
"To examine quantitatively whether the user organization is getting from the operation of its equipment the best attainable contribution to its overall objective."
With expanded techniques and growing awareness of the field at the close of the war, operational research was no longer limited to only operational, but was extended to encompass equipment procurement, training, logistics and infrastructure. Operations Research also grew in many areas other than the military once scientists learned to apply its principles to the civilian sector. With the development of the simplex algorithm for linear programming in 1947 and the development of computers over the next three decades, Operations Research can now solve problems with hundreds of thousands of variables and constraints. Moreover, the large volumes of data required for such problems can be stored and manipulated very efficiently." Much of operations research (modernly known as 'analytics') relies upon stochastic variables and a therefore access to truly random numbers. Fortunately, the cybernetics field also required the same level of randomness. The development of increasingly better random number generators has been a boon to both disciplines. Modern applications of operations research includes city planning, football strategies, emergency planning, optimizing all facets of industry and economy, and undoubtedly with the likelihood of the inclusion of terrorist attack planning and definitely counterterrorist attack planning. More recently, the research approach of operations research, which dates back to the 1950s, has been criticized for being collections of mathematical models but lacking an empirical basis of data collection for applications. How to collect data is not presented in the textbooks. Because of the lack of data, there are also no computer applications in the textbooks.

Problems addressed
 Critical path analysis or project planning: identifying those processes in a multiple-dependency project which affect the overall duration of the project
 Floorplanning: designing the layout of equipment in a factory or components on a computer chip to reduce manufacturing time (therefore reducing cost)
 Network optimization: for instance, setup of telecommunications or power system networks to maintain quality of service during outages
 Resource allocation problems
 Facility location
 Assignment Problems:
Assignment problem
 Generalized assignment problem
 Quadratic assignment problem
 Weapon target assignment problem
 Bayesian search theory: looking for a target
 Optimal search
 Routing, such as determining the routes of buses so that as few buses are needed as possible
 Supply chain management: managing the flow of raw materials and products based on uncertain demand for the finished products
 Project production activities: managing the flow of work activities in a capital project in response to system variability through operations research tools for variability reduction and buffer allocation using a combination of allocation of capacity, inventory and time
 Efficient messaging and customer response tactics
 Automation: automating or integrating robotic systems in human-driven operations processes
 Globalization: globalizing operations processes in order to take advantage of cheaper materials, labor, land or other productivity inputs
 Transportation: managing freight transportation and delivery systems (Examples: LTL shipping, intermodal freight transport, travelling salesman problem, driver scheduling problem)
 Scheduling:
 Personnel staffing
 Manufacturing steps
 Project tasks
 Network data traffic: these are known as queueing models or queueing systems.
 Sports events and their television coverage
 Blending of raw materials in oil refineries
 Determining optimal prices, in many retail and B2B settings, within the disciplines of pricing science
 Cutting stock problem: Cutting small items out of bigger ones.

Operational research is also used extensively in government where evidence-based policy is used.

Management science

In 1967 Stafford Beer characterized the field of management science as "the business use of operations research". Like operational research itself, management science (MS) is an interdisciplinary branch of applied mathematics devoted to optimal decision planning, with strong links with economics, business, engineering, and other sciences. It uses various scientific research-based principles, strategies, and analytical methods including mathematical modeling, statistics and numerical algorithms to improve an organization's ability to enact rational and meaningful management decisions by arriving at optimal or near-optimal solutions to sometimes complex decision problems. Management scientists help businesses to achieve their goals using the scientific methods of operational research.

The management scientist's mandate is to use rational, systematic, science-based techniques to inform and improve decisions of all kinds. Of course, the techniques of management science are not restricted to business applications but may be applied to military, medical, public administration, charitable groups, political groups or community groups.

Management science is concerned with developing and applying models and concepts that may prove useful in helping to illuminate management issues and solve managerial problems, as well as designing and developing new and better models of organizational excellence.

The application of these models within the corporate sector became known as management science.

Related fields
Some of the fields that have considerable overlap with Operations Research and Management Science include:

 Business analytics
 Computer science
 Data mining/Data science/Big data
 Decision analysis
 Decision intelligence
 Engineering
 Financial engineering
 Forecasting
 Game theory
 Geography/Geographic information science
 Graph theory
 Industrial engineering
 Inventory control
 Logistics
 Mathematical modeling
 Mathematical optimization
 Probability and statistics
 Project management
 Policy analysis
 Queueing theory
 Simulation
 Social network/Transportation forecasting models
 Stochastic processes
 Supply chain management
 Systems engineering

Applications
Applications are abundant such as in airlines, manufacturing companies, service organizations, military branches, and government. The range of problems and issues to which it has contributed insights and solutions is vast. It includes:
 Scheduling (of airlines, trains, buses etc.)
 Assignment (assigning crew to flights, trains or buses; employees to projects; commitment and dispatch of power generation facilities)
 Facility location (deciding most appropriate location for new facilities such as warehouses; factories or fire station)
 Hydraulics & Piping Engineering (managing flow of water from reservoirs)
 Health Services (information and supply chain management)
 Game Theory (identifying, understanding; developing strategies adopted by companies)
 Urban Design
 Computer Network Engineering (packet routing; timing; analysis)
 Telecom & Data Communication Engineering (packet routing; timing; analysis)

Management is also concerned with so-called soft-operational analysis which concerns methods for strategic planning, strategic decision support, problem structuring methods. 
In dealing with these sorts of challenges, mathematical modeling and simulation may not be appropriate or may not suffice. Therefore, during the past 30 years, a number of non-quantified modeling methods have been developed. These include:
 stakeholder based approaches including metagame analysis and drama theory
 morphological analysis and various forms of influence diagrams
 cognitive mapping
 strategic choice 
 robustness analysis

Societies and journals

Societies
The International Federation of Operational Research Societies (IFORS) is an umbrella organization for operational research societies worldwide, representing approximately 50 national societies including those in the US, UK, France, Germany, Italy, Canada, Australia, New Zealand, Philippines, India, Japan and South Africa. The constituent members of IFORS form regional groups, such as that in Europe, the Association of European Operational Research Societies (EURO). Other important operational research organizations are Simulation Interoperability Standards Organization (SISO) and Interservice/Industry Training, Simulation and Education Conference (I/ITSEC)

In 2004 the US-based organization INFORMS began an initiative to market the OR profession better, including a website entitled The Science of Better which provides an introduction to OR and examples of successful applications of OR to industrial problems. This initiative has been adopted by the Operational Research Society in the UK, including a website entitled Learn About OR.

Journals of INFORMS
The Institute for Operations Research and the Management Sciences (INFORMS) publishes thirteen scholarly journals about operations research, including the top two journals in their class, according to 2005 Journal Citation Reports. They are:
 Decision Analysis
 Information Systems Research
 INFORMS Journal on Computing
 INFORMS Transactions on Education (an open access journal)
 Interfaces
 Management Science
 Manufacturing & Service Operations Management
 Marketing Science
 Mathematics of Operations Research
 Operations Research
 Organization Science
 Service Science
 Transportation Science

Other journals
These are listed in alphabetical order of their titles.
 4OR-A Quarterly Journal of Operations Research: jointly published the Belgian, French and Italian Operations Research Societies (Springer);
 Decision Sciences published by Wiley-Blackwell on behalf of the Decision Sciences Institute
 European Journal of Operational Research (EJOR): Founded in 1975 and is presently by far the largest operational research journal in the world, with its around 9,000 pages of published papers per year. In 2004, its total number of citations was the second largest amongst Operational Research and Management Science journals;
 INFOR Journal: published and sponsored by the Canadian Operational Research Society;
 Journal of Defense Modeling and Simulation (JDMS): Applications, Methodology, Technology: a quarterly journal devoted to advancing the science of modeling and simulation as it relates to the military and defense.
 Journal of the Operational Research Society (JORS): an official journal of The OR Society; this is the oldest continuously published journal of OR in the world, published by Taylor & Francis;
 Military Operations Research (MOR): published by the Military Operations Research Society;
 Omega - The International Journal of Management Science;
 Operations Research Letters;
 Opsearch: official journal of the Operational Research Society of India;
 OR Insight: a quarterly journal of The OR Society published by Palgrave;
 Pesquisa Operacional, the official journal of the Brazilian Operations Research Society
 Production and Operations Management, the official journal of the Production and Operations Management Society
 TOP: the official journal of the Spanish Statistics and Operations Research Society.

See also

Operations research topics
 Black box analysis
 Dynamic programming
 Inventory theory
 Optimal maintenance
 Real options valuation
 Artificial intelligence

Operations researchers
 Operations researchers (category)
 George Dantzig
 Leonid Kantorovich
 Tjalling Koopmans
 Russell L. Ackoff
 Stafford Beer
 Alfred Blumstein
 C. West Churchman

 William W. Cooper
 Robert Dorfman
 Richard M. Karp
 Ramayya Krishnan
 Frederick W. Lanchester
 Thomas L. Magnanti
 Alvin E. Roth
 Peter Whittle

Related fields
 Behavioral operations research
 Big data
 Business engineering
 Business process management
 Database normalization
 Engineering management
 Geographic information systems
 Industrial engineering
 Industrial organization
 Managerial economics

 Military simulation
 Operational level of war
 Power system simulation
 Project production management
 Reliability engineering
 Scientific management
 Search-based software engineering
 Simulation modeling
 Strategic management
 Supply chain engineering
 System safety
 Wargaming

References

Further reading

Classic books and articles
 R. E. Bellman, Dynamic Programming, Princeton University Press, Princeton, 1957
 Abraham Charnes, William W. Cooper, Management Models and Industrial Applications of Linear Programming, Volumes I and II, New York, John Wiley & Sons, 1961
 Abraham Charnes, William W. Cooper, A. Henderson, An Introduction to Linear Programming, New York, John Wiley & Sons, 1953
 C. West Churchman, Russell L. Ackoff & E. L. Arnoff, Introduction to Operations Research, New York: J. Wiley and Sons, 1957
 George B. Dantzig, Linear Programming and Extensions, Princeton, Princeton University Press, 1963
 Lester K. Ford, Jr., D. Ray Fulkerson, Flows in Networks, Princeton, Princeton University Press, 1962
 Jay W. Forrester, Industrial Dynamics, Cambridge, MIT Press, 1961
 L. V. Kantorovich, "Mathematical Methods of Organizing and Planning Production" Management Science, 4, 1960, 266–422
 Ralph Keeney, Howard Raiffa, Decisions with Multiple Objectives: Preferences and Value Tradeoffs, New York, John Wiley & Sons, 1976
 H. W. Kuhn, "The Hungarian Method for the Assignment Problem," Naval Research Logistics Quarterly, 1–2, 1955, 83–97
 H. W. Kuhn, A. W. Tucker, "Nonlinear Programming," pp. 481–492 in Proceedings of the Second Berkeley Symposium on Mathematical Statistics and Probability
 B. O. Koopman, Search and Screening: General Principles and Historical Applications, New York, Pergamon Press, 1980
 Tjalling C. Koopmans, editor, Activity Analysis of Production and Allocation, New York, John Wiley & Sons, 1951
 Charles C. Holt, Franco Modigliani, John F. Muth, Herbert A. Simon, Planning Production, Inventories, and Work Force, Englewood Cliffs, NJ, Prentice-Hall, 1960
 Philip M. Morse, George E. Kimball, Methods of Operations Research, New York, MIT Press and John Wiley & Sons, 1951
 Robert O. Schlaifer, Howard Raiffa, Applied Statistical Decision Theory, Cambridge, Division of Research, Harvard Business School, 1961

Classic textbooks
 Taha, Hamdy A., "Operations Research: An Introduction", Pearson, 10th Edition, 2016
Frederick S. Hillier & Gerald J. Lieberman, Introduction to Operations Research, McGraw-Hill: Boston MA; 10th Edition, 2014
 Robert J. Thierauf & Richard A. Grosse, "Decision Making Through Operations Research", John Wiley & Sons, INC, 1970
 Harvey M. Wagner, Principles of Operations Research, Englewood Cliffs, Prentice-Hall, 1969
 Wentzel (Ventsel), E. S. Introduction to Operations Research, Moscow: Soviet Radio Publishing House, 1964.

History
 Saul I. Gass, Arjang A. Assad, An Annotated Timeline of Operations Research:  An Informal History. New York, Kluwer Academic Publishers, 2005.
 Saul I. Gass (Editor), Arjang A. Assad (Editor), Profiles in Operations Research: Pioneers and Innovators. Springer, 2011
 Maurice W. Kirby (Operational Research Society (Great Britain)). Operational Research in War and Peace: The British Experience from the 1930s to 1970, Imperial College Press, 2003. , 
 J. K. Lenstra, A. H. G. Rinnooy Kan, A. Schrijver (editors) History of Mathematical Programming: A Collection of Personal Reminiscences, North-Holland, 1991
 Charles W. McArthur, Operations Analysis in the U.S. Army Eighth Air Force in World War II, History of Mathematics, Vol. 4, Providence, American Mathematical Society, 1990
 C. H. Waddington, O. R. in World War 2: Operational Research Against the U-boat, London, Elek Science, 1973.

External links

 What is Operations Research?
 International Federation of Operational Research Societies
 The Institute for Operations Research and the Management Sciences (INFORMS)
 Occupational Outlook Handbook, U.S. Department of Labor Bureau of Labor Statistics

 
Industrial engineering
Mathematical optimization in business
Applied statistics
Engineering disciplines
Mathematical and quantitative methods (economics)
Mathematical economics
Decision-making